Barsness Township is a township in Pope County, Minnesota, United States. The population was 138 at the 2000 census.

History
Barsness Township was named for brothers Erik N. Barsness, Nels N. Barsness, and Ole N. Barsness, Norwegian settlers.  Nels Barsness's daughter, physician Nellie Barsness, was born on the family's homestead there.

The township was originally surveyed in 1857. The first settler was Olaus Olson Grove.

Geography

Demographics
As of the census of 2000, there were 138 people, 50 households, and 39 families residing in the township. The population density was 4.2 people per square mile (1.6/km2). There were 60 housing units at an average density of 1.8/sq mi (0.7/km2). The racial makeup of the township was 99.28% White and 0.72% Native American.

There were 50 households, out of which 38.0% had children under the age of 18 living with them, 74.0% were married couples living together, 2.0% had a female householder with no husband present, and 22.0% were non-families. 20.0% of all households were made up of individuals, and 8.0% had someone living alone who was 65 years of age or older. The average household size was 2.76 and the average family size was 3.21.

In the township the population was spread out, with 28.3% under the age of 18, 6.5% from 18 to 24, 27.5% from 25 to 44, 27.5% from 45 to 64, and 10.1% who were 65 years of age or older. The median age was 39 years. For every 100 females, there were 119.0 males. For every 100 females age 18 and over, there were 102.0 males.

The median income for a household in the township was $33,125, and the median income for a family was $40,000. Males had a median income of $28,333 versus $26,250 for females. The per capita income for the township was $19,867. There were 5.6% of families and 5.1% of the population living below the poverty line, including no under eighteens and 28.6% of those over 64.

References

Townships in Pope County, Minnesota
Townships in Minnesota